Marcus Antonius Jansen (born 1968) is an American painter.

Early life and education 
Jansen was born and raised in New York City. He attended the Kunstgewerbe Schule Berufskolleg für Technik und Medien am Platz der Republik in Mönchengladbach, Germany in 1985, where he spent his adolescence. The city was also his father's birthplace. After his military service and Gulf War deployment, Jansen later became an artist.

Art 

Jansen's solo museum exhibitions include the Triennale di Milano, Milan, Italy, the Museum Zitadelle, Berlin, Germany, the Baker Museum in Naples, Florida, and the Rollins Museum of Art in Winter Park, Florida.

He is represented by Almine Rech in Paris, London, Shanghai, Brussels and New York as well as by Richard Beavers Gallery in Brooklyn and Soho in Manhattan.

Jansen is the author of the book Modern Urban-Expressionism, the art of Marcus Antonius Jansen published in 2006.

Film 

A documentary film by John Scoular, Marcus Jansen Examine and Report, had its world premiere at the Fort Myers Film Festival, and was awarded Best Art TV Pilot Documentary by the East Hampton TV Festival. The film is available on Amazon Prime Video.

Books about Jansen
 Marcus Jansen; Steve Lazarides; Noah Becker; Paul Manazza; Brooke Lynn McGowan, Marcus Jansen: Decade, Skira Editore, 2015,  
 Cordula Gielen; Elmar Zorn, Marcus Jansen: Aftermath, Hirmer Verlag GmbH, 2017,

Collections

Public collections include The Bronx Museum of the Arts, University of Michigan Museum of Art, New Britain Museum of American Art, Kemper Museum of Contemporary Art, Housatonic Museum of Art, Moscow Museum of Modern Art, Ulyanovsk Museum Fine Arts, National Taiwan Museum of Fine Arts, Perm Museum of Contemporary Art, Russia, Smithsonian Institution, U.S. Department of State, Art in Embassies Program, UNESCO in Paris, France.

Awards

 2013: Finalist, Fleurieu Art Prize, Australia
 2013: Arte Laguna Prize, Venice, Italy
 2012: Dave Bown Prize, Dave Bown Projects, United States

References

1968 births
Living people
20th-century American painters
American male painters
21st-century American painters
21st-century American male artists
People from Laurelton, Queens
20th-century American male artists
Neo-expressionist artists